The Beckley Bengals were a Mountain State League baseball team based in Beckley, West Virginia, United States that existed from 1937 to 1938. They played under manager Eli Harris and won the league championship both seasons. They were affiliated with the Detroit Tigers in 1937.

Previously the Beckley Black Knights (later Beckley Miners) played in the Middle Atlantic League from 1931–1935.

Notable Beckley alumni

 Max Butcher (1932)
 Lou Chiozza (1932)
 Johnny Gorsica (1938)
 Lee Grissom (1934) MLB All-Star
 Frank McCormick 9 x MLB All-Star; 1940 NL Most Valuable Player
 Jimmy Outlaw (1940)
 Frank Welch (1931)
 Del Young (1933)
Murray Franklin (1938)

References

External links
Baseball Reference

Baseball teams established in 1931
Sports clubs disestablished in 1938
Defunct minor league baseball teams
Detroit Tigers minor league affiliates
Cincinnati Reds minor league affiliates
Professional baseball teams in West Virginia
Mountain State League teams
Middle Atlantic League teams
1931 establishments in West Virginia
1938 disestablishments in West Virginia
Sports in Beckley, West Virginia
Defunct baseball teams in West Virginia
Baseball teams disestablished in 1938